Brancsikia freyi is the type species in its genus of praying mantids: in the family Majangidae.

See also
Dead leaf mantis

External links
Animal Diversity

Mantodea
Insects described in 1893